WTOL (channel 11) is a television station in Toledo, Ohio, United States, affiliated with CBS. It is owned by Tegna Inc., which provides certain services to Fox affiliate WUPW (channel 36) under a joint sales agreement (JSA) with American Spirit Media. Both stations share studios on North Summit Street in downtown Toledo, while WTOL's transmitter is located on Cedar Point Road in Oregon, Ohio.

History
WTOL-TV began broadcasting on December 5, 1958, as a CBS affiliate with a secondary NBC affiliation, sharing it with then-ABC affiliate WSPD-TV (channel 13, now WTVG) until 1969 when WDHO-TV (channel 24, now WNWO-TV) replaced WSPD-TV as the ABC affiliate. WTOL then became exclusively affiliated with CBS. WTOL is also the only station in Toledo to never change its primary affiliation.

The station was originally owned by the family of former area prosecutor and congressman Frazier Reams along with WTOL radio (AM 1230, now WCWA; and FM 104.7, now WIOT). It was sold to Filmways (now part of Metro-Goldwyn-Mayer) in 1962. The Broadcasting Company of the South, a subsidiary of South Carolina insurer Liberty Life Insurance Company, bought WTOL in 1965 and later changed its name to Cosmos Broadcasting Corporation; WTOL was that company's only station located outside the Southern United States. Liberty reorganized itself as a holding company, the Liberty Corporation, in 1974, and WTOL came directly under the Liberty banner after Liberty sold off its insurance business in 2003.

From the mid-1970s to 2003, WTOL was known on-air as "Toledo 11" (sometimes spelled out as "Toledo Eleven").
In December 1994, WTOL replaced Detroit's WJBK on the lineup of Cancom (later Shaw Broadcast Services), which provided American networks to cable and satellite viewers in many areas across Canada (particularly Atlantic Canada and the Prairies). The changeover occurred shortly before WJBK was due to switch its affiliation from CBS to Fox as part of Fox's deal with New World Communications. CBS was unable to sign a new Detroit affiliate (WGPR, now owned-and-operated station WWJ-TV) until mere days before the change, partly because of a deal reached by Scripps which saw WXYZ-TV renew its affiliation with ABC and caused three other stations to switch to the network. As Cancom had to seek regulatory approval several months in advance, it elected to go with WTOL, the largest CBS station closest to Detroit. WTOL was carried by Cancom until 1999, when it was replaced with WWJ-TV. During this time, WTOL was the de facto CBS affiliate for the southern part of the Detroit market, as WWJ-TV was all but unviewable in that area at the time. The station provides city-grade coverage to most of Monroe County and much of southern Wayne and Washtenaw counties, and grade B coverage to most of Detroit itself.

Raycom Media announced its acquisition of Liberty Media in 2005. Raycom already owned WNWO, but couldn't keep both because the Federal Communications Commission (FCC) does not allow one entity to own two of the top four rated stations in a single market. It opted to keep the higher-rated WTOL and sold WNWO to Barrington Broadcasting, who acquired that station in 2006.

WTOL's broadcasts became digital-only, effective June 12, 2009. Digital channel 11 transmits at a lower power than it did on digital channel 17, so in some locations, there has been a reduction in coverage. Many VHF stations are applying to the FCC for power increases to restore their coverage area after moving from UHF back to VHF.

On January 30, 2012, WTOL replaced its News 11 Now on 11.2 with MeTV. In January 2012, LIN TV Corporation announced it would sell its local Fox affiliate WUPW to American Spirit Media for $22 million. As most of American Spirit Media's stations are operated as duopolies with a Raycom-owned station in the same market, it was expected that WTOL would establish a joint sales agreement with WUPW. On April 20, 2012, WUPW finalized its acquisition and its shared services agreement with WTOL. WUPW's remaining staff now operate from WTOL's facilities (though its management and sales departments will remain separate). A shared news site was also unveiled for the two stations, Toledo News Now.

Tegna ownership
On June 25, 2018, Atlanta-based Gray Television announced it had reached an agreement with Raycom to merge their respective broadcasting assets (consisting of Raycom's 63 existing owned-and/or-operated television stations, and Gray's 93 television stations) under Gray's corporate umbrella, in a cash-and-stock merger transaction valued at $3.6 billion. Because Gray owned WTVG (which the company acquired in 2014 from SJL Broadcasting), and since WTOL and WTVG rank among the four highest-rated stations in the Toledo market in total day viewership, Gray announced that it would retain WTVG and sell WTOL to an unrelated third party, in order to comply with FCC ownership rules; the JSA involving WUPW would be included in the sale of WTOL. On August 20, it was announced that McLean, Virginia-based Tegna Inc. would purchase WTOL and sister station KWES-TV in Odessa, Texas for $105 million. The deal was completed on January 2, 2019. This made WTOL a sister station to NBC affiliate WKYC in Cleveland (and later to fellow CBS affiliate WBNS-TV in Columbus from a separate deal), while separating it from WOIO/WUAB.

Even with the ownership changes that have occurred since 2006, WTOL retains its Liberty-era logo.

Subchannels
The station's digital signal is multiplexed:

Programming

Sports programming
WTOL airs regional and national sports programming from CBS Sports. WTOL also carries preseason Cleveland Browns games from WEWS-TV.

News operation
, WTOL presently broadcasts 40 hours of locally produced newscasts each week (with six hours each weekday, three hours on Saturdays and two hours on Sundays). In addition, WTOL produces 18½ hours of locally produced newscasts each week for Fox-affiliated sister station WUPW (with 3½ hours each weekday and a half-hour each on Saturdays and Sundays). Through the shared services agreement with WUPW, WTOL may also simulcast long-form severe weather coverage on channel 36 in the event that a tornado warning is issued for any county in its northwest Ohio viewing area.

In October 2011, WTOL was certified by WeatheRate as having the most accurate forecasts for Northwest Ohio and Southeast Michigan.

On January 2, 2014, it was officially announced that longtime evening news anchor Chrys Peterson would be leaving WTOL after nearly twenty years at the station. Peterson decided to leave the station in order to spend more time with her family. Chrys Peterson's final news broadcast was on February 28, 2014, and an hour-long special aired at 8:00 p.m. in celebration of Peterson's twenty years at WTOL. On April 24, 2014, it was officially announced that Emilie Voss would succeed Chrys Peterson and join Jerry Anderson as the evening anchor on WTOL.

In January 2017, Emilie Voss announced she would leave WTOL after five years. In February, Kristi Leigh (formerly of WNWO, WUPW and WTVG) was named co-anchor of the 5, 5:30, 6 and 11 p.m. broadcasts. In June 2018, Jerry Anderson announced his retirement, with June 15 being his final day on the air. Morning anchor Andrew Kinsey was promoted to the evening shift while longtime reporter and fill-in anchor Tim Miller assumed morning anchor duties as of June 18, 2018. Longtime sports director Dan Cummins, a fixture at WTOL since 1980, also moved to the news desk and is co-anchor of the noon news. Jordan Strack was named the new sports director.

In March 2019, WTOL attracted viral attention for video it posted on Facebook to motivate local high school students heading into their exams, which featured its anchors excessively using slang. The segment received mixed attention, with some observers considering it to be an exaggerated attempt to appeal to the demographic, but others applauding the anchors' willingness to participate in the video. It was quickly removed by the station, but mirrored copies on sites such as Twitter reached as high as 3 million views.

On-air staff

Notable former on-air staff
Evan Rosen author of The Culture of Collaboration and The Bounty Effect: 7 Steps to the Culture of Collaboration
Steve Hartman (now at CBS News)

References

External links 

CBS network affiliates
True Crime Network affiliates
Grit (TV network) affiliates
Quest (American TV network) affiliates
GetTV affiliates
Twist (TV network) affiliates
Laff (TV network) affiliates
TOL
Tegna Inc.
Television channels and stations established in 1958
1958 establishments in Ohio